Edward Adrian Hoekstra (4 November 1937 – 10 November 2011) was a Canadian professional ice hockey player. He played in the National Hockey League (NHL) with the Philadelphia Flyers and also played in the World Hockey Association (WHA) with the Houston Aeros. He was the brother of Cecil Hoekstra.

External links
 

1937 births
2011 deaths
Buffalo Bisons (AHL) players
Canadian ice hockey centres
Canadian people of Dutch descent
Cleveland Barons (1937–1973) players
Denver Spurs players
Greensboro Generals players
Hamilton Red Wings (OHA) players
Houston Aeros (WHA) players
Jacksonville Barons players
Macon Whoopees (SHL) players
Philadelphia Flyers players
Quebec Aces (AHL) players
Ice hockey people from Winnipeg
Springfield Kings players
St. Catharines Teepees players